The Union Pacific International Railroad Bridge is the only railway international bridge that crosses the U.S.-Mexico border between the cities of Eagle Pass, Texas, and Piedras Negras, Coahuila. The U.S. portion is owned and operated by Union Pacific Railroad, with BNSF Railway having trackage rights.  The Mexican portion is owned by the Mexican federal government, with operation concessioned to Ferromex. It is also known as the Eagle Pass-Piedras Negras International Railway Bridge. The bridge is the second busiest international rail crossing between the U.S. and Mexico.

See also
 Brownsville & Matamoros International Bridge

References

International bridges in Texas
International bridges in Coahuila
Buildings and structures in Maverick County, Texas
Railroad bridges in Texas
Railway bridges in Mexico
International
Southern Pacific Railroad
Transportation in Maverick County, Texas
Metal bridges in the United States
Truss bridges in the United States
Metal bridges
Truss bridges